Nakfa may refer to:

 the currency of Eritrea, see Eritrean nakfa
 a town in Eritrea, see Nakfa, Eritrea
 a district in Eritrea, see Nakfa District